The Walbrook Club is a social and business dining club near the Bank of England and the Mansion House located in the Ward of Walbrook in London.

The Club is set in a Queen Anne-style townhouse at the end of a private court next door to the UK offices of Rothschild's, the Church of St Stephen's, and opposite the Bloomberg European Headquarters. There is a bar, a dining room, and two smaller private rooms.

History
Formerly the family offices of the life peer and former Chairman of the Arts Council of Great Britain, Lord Palumbo, The Walbrook Club opened its doors in May 2000 and was the last club designed by the late Mark Birley of Mark's Club, Annabel's and Harry's Bar. The townhouse itself was designed and built in the early 1950s by Peter Palumbo's father, the property developer Rudolph Palumbo. The merchant banker and philanthropist Rupert Hambro was the first chairman of the board.

Club life
The Walbrook serves British and European cuisine. A jacket and collared shirt for men (ties are now optional) and smart business attire for women are mandatory during all visits to the Club, with jeans, sports, suede and leatherwear forbidden. Membership is offered on an equal basis to men and women. Overseas, Corporate (minimum of two, maximum five applicants per application from the same company) and Junior Membership (U-35) are the other Membership criteria.

References

External links

 

2000 establishments in England
Buildings and structures in the City of London
Dining clubs
Organizations established in 2000